Stucky may refer to:

People
Galen D. Stucky (active since 1964), American inorganic materials chemist
Janaka Stucky (born 1978), American poet and publisher
Mark P. Stucky (born 1948), American astronaut
Scott W. Stucky (born 1948), appeals court judge from Kansas
Steven Stucky (1949−2016), American composer
Lynn Stucky (born 1958), American veterinarian and politician
Giovanni Stucky (1843–1910), Italian businessman

Architecture
Palazzo Grassi, also known as Palazzo Grassi-Stucky, an edifice in the Venetian classical style located on the Grand Canal of Venice
Molino Stucky, a Neo-Gothic building in Venice

Other uses
 Stucky (fandom), the fan-imagined relationship between Captain America (Steve Rogers) and Bucky Barnes
 13211 Stucky, a main-belt asteroid